Indonesia–Lebanon relations were officially established in 1950. Indonesia has an embassy in Beirut and a consulate general in Tripoli, while Lebanon has an embassy in Jakarta.

History
The bilateral relations between Indonesia and Lebanon started with de jure acknowledgement of Indonesian Republic by Lebanese President Bechara El-Khoury on July 29, 1947. Lebanon was the third nations that recognize the sovereignty of Indonesia after Egypt and Syria. The diplomatic relations was officially established in 1950, through Indonesian embassy in Cairo that also accredited to Lebanon. In mid 1950s Indonesia established their representative office in Beirut, however it was closed in 1976 because of Lebanese Civil War. In 1995 Lebanon established their embassy in Jakarta, and reciprocated by Indonesia in following year. Indonesia established their embassy in Beirut in 1996, and a consulate general in Tripoli in 1997, the second largest city in Lebanon.

In 2006, Indonesia sent a contingent of more than 1,000 soldiers as members of the United Nations peacekeeping force in southern Lebanon.

Notes

External links
Embassy of Indonesia in Beirut, Lebanon
Embassy of Lebanon in Jakarta, Indonesia

 
Lebanon
Bilateral relations of Lebanon